Margaret Ann Bradshaw (née Cresswell; born 31 December 1941) is a New Zealand geologist and a retired staff member at the University of Canterbury. She is considered a trailblazer and influential female role model in Antarctic research.

Early life and education 
Born Margaret Ann Cresswell in Nottingham, England, on 31 December 1941, she married John Dudley Bradshaw in Nottingham in 1963, and they moved to Christchurch, New Zealand, in 1966. Bradshaw began her work there on Devonian invertebrate palaeontology, gradually incorporating Antarctica into her research. She became a naturalised New Zealand citizen in 1980.

Career and impact 
Bradshaw focused her research on the structure and stratigraphy of Devonian rocks in New Zealand and Antarctica. Specifically she worked on the development and relationship of Paleozoic terrains in New Zealand, as well as the paleobiogeography of Devonian Bivalves and the Paleontology and environmental significance of Paleozoic Trace fossils in both New Zealand, Antarctica and Australia. Bradshaw was a curator at the Canterbury Museum and her initial trips to Antarctica were to collect fossils and rocks for the Antarctic display.

Bradshaw was the curator of Geology at the Canterbury Museum for 17 years. Her first trip to Antarctica was from 1975 to 1976 to collect specimens for the museum's Antarctic Hall. Bradshaw was the first woman to lead an Antarctic deep field party in her 1979 to 1980 field season to the remote Ohio Range and she was the first to discover new fish fossils in the exposures of the Cook Mountains in her 1988 to 1989 field season.

Bradshaw was the president of the New Zealand Antarctic Society for 10 years until 2003. She is a member of the Association of Australian Paleontologists.

Awards and honours 
Bradshaw is the second woman to win the Queen's Polar Medal, and the first New Zealand woman to be awarded this medal, in 1993. She received the Royal Society of New Zealand Science & Technology Medal in 1994. Bradshaw is a New Zealand Antarctic Society Life Member, nominated in 2006. In 2017, Bradshaw was selected as one of the Royal Society Te Apārangi's "150 women in 150 words", celebrating the contributions of women to knowledge in New Zealand.

Bradshaw Peak, situated on the south west side of the McLay Glacier in Antarctica, is named in her honour.

References 

1941 births
Living people
People from Nottingham
English emigrants to New Zealand
New Zealand recipients of the Polar Medal
New Zealand Antarctic scientists
Academic staff of the University of Canterbury
Women Antarctic scientists
20th-century New Zealand women scientists
20th-century British women scientists
20th-century New Zealand geologists
Women geologists
Female recipients of the Polar Medal
Naturalised citizens of New Zealand
21st-century New Zealand geologists